, also known as , is a fictional character from the Final Fantasy video game series made by Square Enix. He is the main antagonist in Final Fantasy XV (2016)−originally a spin-off title called Final Fantasy Versus XIII−a prominent character in the game's associated media, and has made appearances in other Final Fantasy products. Initially presented as chancellor of Nilfheim, the nation opposing Lucis for control of its magical Crystal, he is later revealed to be the source of a corruptive plague dubbed the Starscourge and pursuing a vendetta against the family of protagonist Noctis Lucis Caelum.

Ardyn was designed by Italian artist Roberto Ferrari in 2010, surviving though the game's turbulent development generally unchanged. He was presented as an unusual villain within the series, initially helpful to Noctis but ultimately driven by revenge and a wish for cruelty. He is voiced in Japanese by Keiji Fujiwara and in English by Darin De Paul. Critical reception to Ardyn's character was generally positive. While many critics appreciated his antagonism of Noctis in the main storyline of Final Fantasy XV, some felt that he is not presented as an effective villain. The exploration of his origin story in Episode Ardyn and its tie-in special is also generally well-received.

Creation and development
Final Fantasy XV (2016) began production in 2006 as the spin-off game Final Fantasy Versus XIII for PlayStation 3; following a troubled production history, the game was rebranded, resulting in it changing platforms and staff, and seeing multiple story rewrites. Some cut content and backstory elements were made into the prequel movie Kingsglaive, and the original net animation (ONA) Brotherhood, part of the multimedia "Final Fantasy XV Universe". Ardyn Izunia was created in 2010 as an antagonist following the deletion of another character called Safay Roth. Ardyn was designed by Roberto Ferrari, who worked on the project from 2010 to 2013. After the initial design work Ferrari "brushed it up" the following month, with it otherwise remaining unchanged. He commented that the in-game version of Izunia was closest to his original design compared to the one shown in Kingsglaive. Ardyn's red hair was chosen as a reference to his Japanese voice actor, who had voiced other red-haired characters in Final Fantasy and Kingdom Hearts.

Ardyn was one of the characters who overlapped between the different parts of the Final Fantasy XV Universe, alongside protagonist Noctis Lucis Caelum and supporting character Lunafreya Nox Fleuret. The project's later director Hajime Tabata called Ardyn an unusual antagonist within the Final Fantasy series as he actively helps Noctis through his quest, even though it ultimately serves his desire for revenge. Both Tabata and scenario writer Saori Itamuro called Ardyn a character driven by hatred of the Lucian royal line, with everything in his life serving his quest for revenge and his wish to torment Noctis. Hajime Tabata described Ardyn's unique design as tying into his personality, comparing it to the design of Final Fantasy VI antagonist Kefka Palazzo.

Following the game's release, Ardyn was considered for dedicated downloadable content (DLC) due to positive fan feedback.  Planning for the DLC release "Episode Ardyn" originated with the development of Episode Ardyn Prologue, a short ONA detailing Ardyn's backstory. According to its lead staff, the aim was to show more emotion in Ardyn, while his gameplay featured greater freedom of movement than the main game and a focus on his dark powers. His gameplay was also designed to show his cruelty, though some considered actions were dropped so as to perserve the game's CERO rating. The team wanted to create a Final Fantasy with a villain in the lead, a rarity in the series. Ardyn's relationships with his brother Somnus and fiancee Aera were meant to be the focal point of the ONA narrative, but its short length limited this element. The events of the ONA were also intended to lend context to some of Ardyn's in-game actions.

Ardyn is voiced by Keiji Fujiwara in Japanese and Darin De Paul in English. Fujiwara often told the staff he liked Ardyn's character, and the staff noted his enthusiasm with playing the character, enjoying his performance. Fujiwara was often surprised that he managed to give his character a sense of tension, most notably when he laughs loudly as it exceeded the staff's impressions as well as the fanbase. For Episode Ardyn, Fujiawara was requested to do "the opposite", starting by portraying Ardyn in a heroic way and shifting his performance to his villainous form as the story progressed. Paul was used to portraying deeper-voiced characters, leading to him almost not auditioning. He changed his mind as he "got [the] character", landing the role with a single take. Speaking on "Episode Ardyn" Paul lemjoyed the contrast between Ardyn's different personalities through the narrative. Ardyn's motion capture for XV was performed by Teruaki Ogawa. In Kingsglaive, his face was based on actor Edward Saxby, and his motion actor is Jon Campling.

Appearances

Final Fantasy XV
Ardyn is initially introduced as the Imperial Chancellor of Eos's Niflheim empire, regarded as both its main political force and its benefactor of its advances in Magitek technology in its war with the nation of Lucis over its magical Crystal. In reality he is Ardyn Lucis Caelum, a healer who was granted the ability to absorb the Starscourge, a magical plague which threatens Eos with eternal night and turns people into monstrous Daemons. His growing infection caused him to be ostracised by his brother Somnus and rejected by the Crystal, an event compounded by the death of his lover Aera Mirus Fleuret during his fight with Somnus; this was later revealed as part of a plan by the divine Astrals to purge Eos of the Starscourge. In the present day, he orchestrates the events that lead to Niflheim's invasion of Insomnia, and guides Somnus's descendent Noctis in forming Covenants with the Astrals so he can kill him once he becomes the True King. Ardyn reveals his villainous nature by fatally wounding Lunafreya after she summons the Astral Leviathan, then harassing Noctis first by tricking him into attacking his friend Prompto, and revealing the truth of their kinship when Noctis reaches the Crystal. After ten years, Ardyn faces Noctis in single-combat in the ruins of Insomnia. Noctis destroys first Ardyn's body and then his spirit, completing his role and purging Eos of the Starscourge.

In "Episode Ardyn", set thirty years before the game's events, he is freed from a two millennia imprisonment by Niflheim. Initially reluctant, upon subduing the Astral Ifrit he learns something of his intended role, and allies with Niflheim to pursue revenge. He embraces his dark powers, gradually losing his sanity and adopting the name "Izunia" after absorbing the memories of those killed by the Starscourge. Ardyn launches an assault on Insomnia on the coronation day of Noctis's father Regis, nearly killing him to force Somnus to manifest in his spirit form. Ardyn overpowers Somnus before the Astral's leader Bahamut intervenes and reveals Ardyn's destined role as the embodiment of the Starscourge and his prophesied death at the True King's hand. Depending on the player's choice, Ardyn either submits to his fate in exchange for his revenge against Noctis's family, or is tortured into submission by Bahamut; the former is confirmed to be the canon route. Upon his return to reality, Ardyn vows to kill the True King in defiance of the Astrals.

Other appearances
Ardyn briefly appears in Kingsglaive as a representative of Niflheim, proposing a truce between the two nations with the marriage of Noctis and Lunafreya . He remains present during most of the film's events accompanying Niflheim's emperor Iedolas Aldercapt up to the invasion of Insomnia and theft of the Crystal. In the 2019 novel Final Fantasy XV: The Dawn of the Future, a defiant Ardyn rebels, prompting Bahamut to plan the destruction of Eos. Eventually Noctis and a resurrected Lunafreya convince him to perform the ritual of the True King in Noctis's place, allowing him to kill Bahamut, erase the Starscourge, and make peace with Somnus and Aera.

Ardyn was added as a playable character to two current titles in the Dissidia subseries. He was a DLC character for both the home console and arcade versions of Dissidia Final Fantasy NT. Ardyn was the last original character added before Square Enix ended support for the game in 2020. He was added as a permanent addition to the mobile title Dissidia Final Fantasy: Opera Omnia in December 2019 in Japan, and September 2020 in English regions.

Ardyn, along with other characters from XV, was featured on an ability card as part of a collaboration with the mobile game Mobius Final Fantasy. He was released as a recruitable character for Final Fantasy Brave Exvius, featuring abilities based on his actions in the main game and a special attack with a CGI sequence. Different depictions of the character also feature in the Final Fantasy Trading Card Game. He was later featured as an enemy character in the rhythm game spin-off Theatrhythm Final Bar Line, with artist Monster Octopus simplifying trademark elements of his design for the game's art style. Outside the Final Fantasy series, Ardyn made a cameo appearance in a crossover with Ubisoft's Assassin's Creed: Origins (2017), and featured as a character skin in a collaboration with Minecraft in 2018.

Reception
Ardyn has received a generally positive reception from critics and players. Ardyn ranked No. 63 in the Top 75 of NHK's "All-Final Fantasy Grand Poll of Japanese players" in 2020, which tallied over 468,000 votes. De Paul's performance was also singled out for praise.

Philip Kollar from Wired described Ardyn as a "particularly dandy-looking envoy from Niflheim who bears more than a passing resemblance to Tom Baker's Doctor Who". RPGamer commented while the game lacks an outstanding supporting character, Ardyn is an exception due to his mysterious characterization and manages to develop into a creepy villain the more time he featured in the story. Joe Anderstron from Digital Spy had mixed feelings with regards to his role in Final Fantasy XV based on what Kingslave foreshadows but found him interesting. Salvatore Pane, writing for Paste Magazine said Ardyn killing Lunafreya had a major impact in the narrative due the amount of grief the characters, specifically Noctis, suffer as a result for the first time in the entire game.

Mike Fahey from Kotaku praised Ardyn's portrayal as the setting's overarching antagonist, citing Episode Ardyn and its anime tie-in as highlights for his character development and making his vendetta against Noctis's family "fully justified". RPG Site's George Foster was very positive, saying the DLC "manages to turn a previously interesting, but oftentimes one-note villain, into a sympathetic figure". USGamers Hirun Cryer was less positive, faulting Ardyn's overarching characterisation and saying Episode Ardyn's narrative undermined the work done during the anime tie-in. Destructoid stated that while Ardyn was kept as a mysterious and interesting villain in Final Fantasy XV, the DLC manages to properly explore his past especially how he destroys the Kingdom of Insomnia and found that his immortality is well translated to gameplay. Eurogamer Italy felt Episode Ardyn prioritises fan service at the expense of narrative coherence.

Ardyn's role in The Dawn of the Future resulted in divided opinions about whether or not it is superior to the original game. Anime UK faulted Ardyn as "easily the low point of the novel, because Jun Eishima's already sparse prose is relegated either to describing very long action sequences that work infinitely better as cutscenes and gameplay, or to hashing out Ardyn's tragic backstory, which doesn't amount to much by the end of the book." RPGFan's Peter Triezenberg found Ardyn and Lunafreya's chapters lacking.

References

Fictional characters with healing abilities
Fictional advisors
Fictional murderers
Fictional swordfighters in video games
Final Fantasy characters
Final Fantasy XV
King characters in video games
Male characters in video games
Male video game villains
Video game characters who use magic
Square Enix protagonists
Video game bosses
Video game characters introduced in 2016
Video game characters who can teleport

ja:ファイナルファンタジーXV#ニフルハイム帝国